Bihu could mean:

 The Bihu festivals of Assam.
 Bihu dances
 Bihu songs
 Bihu Songs of Assam, a book authored by Prafulladutta Goswami.

Culture of Assam